Lance naik (L/Nk) is the equivalent rank to lance corporal in the Indian and Pakistan armies and before 1947, in the British Indian Army, ranking below naik. In cavalry units the equivalent is acting lance daffadar. Like British lance corporals, each wears a single rank chevron.

References

Pakistan Army ranks
Military ranks of British India
Military ranks of the Indian Army